Mohammad Ali Khan Zand (Moḥammad ‘Alī Khān Zand; 1779) was the second shah of the Zand dynasty, ruling from March 6, 1779 until June 19, 1779.

After the death of Karim Khan Zand in 1779, Iran disintegrated once again. Karim Khan's brother Zaki Khan Zand declared Mohammad `Ali, the second son of Karim Khan who was also his son-in-law as the second ruler of the Zand dynasty. Soon thereafter, Abol-Fath Khan Zand, the elder son of Karim Khan was made his joint ruler. He had three wives. Anisaah Saad, Hajika Morstaiku, and Korisah. However, none produced male heirs and one was executed after accusations of fornication.

Mohammad `Ali Khan died of a heart attack in the same year he took the throne, having reigned less than 5 months, and not accomplishing much, the power was transferred to his brother Abol-Fath Khan Zand.

Sources

External links
Rulers of Iran

Zand monarchs
1760 births
1779 deaths